Pratulin  is a village in the administrative district of Gmina Rokitno, within Biała Podlaska County, Lublin Voivodeship, in eastern Poland, close to the border with Belarus.

On 24 January 1874 the Imperial Russian Army killed a group of 13 Greek Catholics in the village. They later became known as the Pratulin Martyrs.

During "Operation Barbarossa" the forest nearby was a staging point for the German 17th Panzer Division. At 3:30am on 22 June 1941 German Panzer and motorized troops decamped from this area, crossing the Bug River and attacking the Soviet Union.

References

Villages in Biała Podlaska County
Brest Litovsk Voivodeship
Kholm Governorate
Lublin Voivodeship (1919–1939)